Sandra Sameh Samir Abdul Salam (born 4 November 1997) is an Egyptian professional tennis player.

Samir won the 2013 U-16 African Junior Tennis Championships.

She has won 13 singles and eight doubles titles on the ITF Women's Circuit. On 26 October 2020, she reached her best singles ranking of world  342. On 17 February 2020, she peaked at No. 370 in the doubles rankings.

Playing for the Egypt Fed Cup team, Samir has a win–loss record of 22–19.

ITF Circuit finals

Singles: 30 (13 titles, 17 runner–ups)

Doubles: 26 (9 titles, 17 runner–ups)

Notes

References

External links

 
 
 

1997 births
Living people
Sportspeople from Giza
Egyptian female tennis players
Tennis players at the 2014 Summer Youth Olympics
African Games gold medalists for Egypt
African Games medalists in tennis
Competitors at the 2015 African Games
Competitors at the 2019 African Games
African Games silver medalists for Egypt
African Games bronze medalists for Egypt